The Embassy of the Republic of Kazakhstan in Moscow is the chief diplomatic mission of Kazakhstan in the Russian Federation. It is located at 3a Chistoprudny Boulevard (Russian: Чистопрудный бульвар, 3а) in the Basmanny District of  Moscow.

The ambassador is Galym Orazbakov.

See also
 Kazakhstan–Russia relations
 Diplomatic missions in Russia

References

External links

  Embassy of Kazakhstan in Moscow

Kazakhstan
Moscow
Kazakhstan–Russia relations